Miraclathurella vittata is an extinct species of sea snail, a marine gastropod mollusk in the family Pseudomelatomidae, the turrids and allies.

Description
The length of the shell attains 12 mm, its diameter 4.1 mm.

Distribution
Fossils of this species were found in Miocene strata in the Bowden Formation, Jamaica; age range: 3.6 to 2.588 Ma.

References

 W. P. Woodring. 1928. Miocene Molluscs from Bowden, Jamaica. Part 2: Gastropods and discussion of results. Contributions to the Geology and Palaeontology of the West Indies.
 B. Landau and C. Marques da Silva. 2010. Early Pliocene gastropods of Cubagua, Venezuela: Taxonomy, palaeobiogeography and ecostratigraphy. Palaeontos 19:1-221

External links
 Fossilworks: Miraclathurella vittata

vittata
Gastropods described in 1928